How Not to Die in Less Than 24 Hours is a metal, rock album written and performed by Positive Infinity. The album was released on December 10, 2005.

Track listing
Music written by Jonathan Roberts
All lyrics written by Jonathan Roberts

"Holding on to Sanity"   – 2:45
"Glassy Tears, Morbid Fears"  – 3:59
"Korbanot"  – 2:49
"The Redundancy of Thee"  – 1:26
"Ample Ability to Amble"  – 4:32
"Train Tracks Lie Cold"  – 2:21
"Emperor's New Clothes"  – 3:43
"Apeirophobia"  – 2:33
"How Not to Die in Less Than 24 Hours"  – 5:20

This CD was originally released as a six track EP with underdeveloped demo versions of most of the tracks. It was later augmented and re-released before being discontinued from production permanently.

Band line-up
Jonathan Roberts – Guitar/Bass/Drums/Lead Vocals/Mixing
David Roberts - Piano

Additional credits
Produced by Jonathan Roberts
The tracks "Holding on to Sanity", "Train Tracks Lie Cold", and "The Redundancy of Thee" were originally co-authored by Lee Arnone. However, with the re-release of this CD, these tracks were redone without Lee Arnone.
The Quote used for the beginning of "Holding on to Sanity" was from the movie Twelve Monkeys.

2005 albums
Positive Infinity albums